Nuxia is a genus of plants in the family Stilbaceae described as a genus in 1791. It was formerly placed in the Loganiaceae and Buddlejaceae families.

Nuxia is native to Africa, the Arabian Peninsula, and certain islands in the Indian Ocean.

Species

References

External links
 http://www.theplantlist.org/browse/A/Stilbaceae/Nuxia/

Lamiales genera
Stilbaceae
Taxonomy articles created by Polbot